The Netball Super League, often referred as NSL, is a professional netball league based in Malaysia. It was established by the Malaysian Netball Association and Astro Group’s subsidiary, Astro Arena, to develop and grow the sport in Malaysia. The first season commenced on 19 March 2021 at the Juara Stadium in Bukit Kiara, Kuala Lumpur. The KL Wildcats were the inaugural champions, beating the Johor Jewels in the Grand Final.

History 
Netball became a popular women's sport in Malaysia around the turn of the century following the nation's success of hosting the first-ever netball competition as a medal event at the Commonwealth Games in 1998 and the Southeast Asian (SEA) Games in 2001. On the back of two consecutive gold medal performances at the SEA Games in 2017 and 2019, the Malaysian Netball Association decided to form the NSL in 2020, which was later delayed to 2021 due to the COVID-19 pandemic and a movement control order imposed by the Malaysian government.

Competition format 
The NSL uses standard International Netball Federation (INF) rules and regulations. 

For the 2021 season, teams are separated into two groups and play each other twice (a double round-robin system) for six games, in which three points are awarded for a win, one for a draw and zero for a loss. The top two of each group advance to a single-elimination knockout phase, with the winners progressing to the Grand Final and the two defeated teams contesting a third-placed play-off.

Champions

Individual awards

Clubs

2021 season

References

External links 
 Official Facebook page

Sports leagues in Malaysia
Netball competitions in Malaysia
Netball leagues
2020 establishments in Malaysia